The Federal Supreme Council, also known as Supreme Council of Rulers, is the highest constitutional authority in the United Arab Emirates, being the highest legislative and executive body. It replaced the earlier Trucial States Council upon the formation of the United Arab Emirates in 1971. and establishes general policies and sanctions federal legislation.
It is the First Federal Authority in terms of ranking in the hierarchy of the Five Federal Authorities prescribed in the Constitution: Federal Supreme Council, Federal President and Federal Vice President, Federal Cabinet, Federal National Council, Federal Judiciary.

History
Trucial States Council was established as an informal consultative body and held its first meeting on 23 March 1952 to bring the rulers closer together with the possibility of their forming some political or economic association in the future. It came into being following the British recognition of Fujairah as an independent emirate within the Trucial States. The council met twice a year under the chairmanship of the British representative in Dubai and held 30 such meetings between 1952 and 1968. In 1964, Adi Bitar was appointed as a legal adviser to the council. In 1965, the Trucial Coast Development Council was established. In 1966, the British political agency withdrew itself from presiding over the meetings and Sheikh Saqr al-Qasimi was elected as the president. He was soon replaced by Sheikh Zayed bin Sultan, the ruler of Abu Dhabi.

After the Union in 1971, the Trucial States Council consisted of the six rulers of the Emirates who signed the Constitution of the United Arab Emirates and was renamed as the Federal Supreme Council. It elected Sheikh Zayed bin Sultan Al Nahyan, Emir of Abu Dhabi, as President of the United Arab Emirates and elected a Federal Cabinet. On 23 December 1971 the Emirate of Ras al-Khaimah sent a letter to the Council requesting to join the union. The Council agreed to the request and the Ras al-Khaimah joined the Union on 10 February 1972.

Council meetings

The Federal Supreme Council meets four times each year and its meetings are often on an informal basis and attend meetings of the Board, consisting of the seven rulers of the emirates of the Federation or those acting in their emirate in the case of their absence. Each has one vote in the council's resolutions.

Council functions
The Supreme Council of the Union has the following functions:

 The general policies in all matters entrusted to the Union by this Constitution and to consider what would that achieve the objectives of the Union and the common interests of the member Emirates.
 The ratification of the various federal laws before they are issued, including the laws of the annual general budget of the Union and the final account.
 The ratification of the decrees on the subject matters under the provisions of this Constitution for the ratification or approval of the Federal Supreme Council prior to the issuance of these decrees by the Federal President.
 Ratification of institutions and agreements are ratified by decree.
 To approve the appointment of the Federal Prime Minister and the Federal Cabinet and the acceptance of their resignation and removal from office upon the proposal of the Federal President.
 To approve the appointment of the President and Judges of the Federal Supreme Court and the acceptance of their resignations and dismissal in the circumstances prescribed in the Constitution. Are all decrees.
 High control over the affairs of the Union in general.
 Any other functions stipulated in this Constitution or federal laws.

Current members
The Federal Supreme Council consists of the seven rulers of each emirate:

References

a. the Constitution provides that the Emirs of Abu Dhabi and Dubai have a vetoتاريخ الإمارات العربية المتحدةالمجلس الأعلى للاتحادSupreme Council/ Politics of the United Arab Emirates

External links
 

United Arab Emirates
Government of the United Arab Emirates
Politics of the United Arab Emirates
United Arab Emirates
1971 establishments in the United Arab Emirates